The Sémillante was a Surveillante class 60-gun first rank frigate of the French Navy. She sank off the coast of Corsica in 1855 with a loss of 693 people.

Career 
Sémillante took part in the Crimean war from 1854 as a transport. In February 1855, under Captain Jugan, she departed Toulon with a crew of 301 and 392 soldiers as reinforcements for the French army

On 15 February 1855, in the Strait of Bonifacio near the Lavezzi Islands, Sémillante was caught in a storm. Lost in a thick fog, a gust of wind drove the ship into rocks on Ile Lavezzi, the 200 ha main island of the archipelago. The ship sank around midnight with all hands.

Monument 
For weeks, bodies of the victims washed up on the shore of  Île Lavezzi. The remains of 600 of the people on board were eventually recovered and buried in the Achiarino cemetery on the island. Only the captain's grave is marked by name. A  pyramid of boulders was built as a remembrance of the disaster.

The wreck is cited as a triggering event that raised public awareness of naval disasters and spurred the creation of coastal rescue organizations.

See also
Cavallo (island)
List of shipwrecks

References

Sources
The Corsica News February 07, 1991.
Corsica, by Oda O'Carroll and David Atkinson
Napoleon.Org article

Age of Sail frigates of France
Ships built in France
Shipwrecks in the Mediterranean Sea
Crimean War naval ships of France
Maritime incidents in February 1855
1841 ships
Surveillante-class frigates